Chris McKenna is an American television writer, film producer, screenwriter, and television producer. He has written for American Dad!, Community, and The Mindy Project, and part of the first Marvel Cinematic Universe Spider-Man trilogy (2017–2021).

Career
McKenna was an uncredited writer on the 2004 film The Girl Next Door, having developed the screenplay with director Luke Greenfield. He was denied credit by the WGA arbitration process.

McKenna wrote some of Communitys most critically acclaimed episodes, including "Paradigms of Human Memory", "Conspiracy Theories and Interior Design", and the Emmy- and Hugo-nominated "Remedial Chaos Theory". He also co-wrote (along with his brother Matt McKenna) one of the most acclaimed episodes of American Dad!, "Rapture's Delight".

During his time as a writer for American Dad, he met Erik Sommers, who would later become his writing partner. Together they have since written for The Lego Batman Movie (2017), co-writing Spider-Man: Homecoming (2017) and its sequels, Far From Home (2019) and No Way Home (2021), along with Jumanji: Welcome to the Jungle (2017) and Ant-Man and the Wasp (2018).

Having worked with the Russo brothers on the sitcom Community, McKenna contributed to the script of Captain America: The Winter Soldier (2014) by writing jokes for the film.

Filmography

Film
Writer
 Igor (2008)
 The Lego Batman Movie (2017)
 Spider-Man: Homecoming (2017)
 Jumanji: Welcome to the Jungle (2017)
 Ant-Man and the Wasp (2017)
 Spider-Man: Far From Home (2019)
 Spider-Man: No Way Home (2021)
 Ghosted (2023)

Assistant
 The Thing Called Love (1993)
 Little Miss Millions (1993) (Production assistant)
 Greedy (1994)
 Grumpier Old Men (1995)

Executive producer
 Registered Sex Offender (2008)

Special thanks
 Cloudy with a Chance of Meatballs (2009)

Television

References

External links

American television writers
American television producers
American male screenwriters
Living people
American male television writers
Place of birth missing (living people)
1967 births